The Stockton International Riverside Festival (SIRF) is an annual outdoor arts festival in Stockton-on-Tees, England. It includes British and international performers.

History 
The first Stockton Riverside Festival was founded by Frank Wilson and the first festival took place in August 1988. Now known as the Stockton International Riverside Festival (SIRF) it has grown into an internationally famous event that attracts thousands of spectators. In 2015 founder, Frank Wilson, was awarded an MBE for his services to the festival arts in the North East, recognising the impact the festival had made to Stockton. In 2017 SIRF celebrated its 30th anniversary.

Stockton Riverside Fringe Festival
In 1991 local musicians collaborated to start the Stockton Riverside Fringe Festival as a companion event to SIRF. It grew from a small, free, one-stage, one-day fringe event that was intended to showcase local talent to become, by its tenth festival in 2010, a multi-stage, paid for event headlined by as Calvin Harris. From 2011 onwards, it was produced by the Tees Music Alliance in collaboration with Stockton Borough Council and it was renamed the Stockton Weekender. It was headlined by Maxïmo Park in 2011,  The Pogues in 2012,  Primal Scream in 2013 and by Public Enemy in 2014, which would be its last year. Following the festival, Tees Valley Music Alliance announced that it would no longer be organising the festival as it had failed to sell enough tickets to cover its costs and considered it to no longer be financially viable.

Festival Programme 
Since the mid-1990s SIRF has been regularly funded by Stockton Borough Council and since 2012 the council has received National Portfolio Organisation funding from Arts Council England to the value of approximately £200,000 per annum. The Festival Programme is delivered by a dedicated team employed by the local authority.

Festival Directors

Community Carnival Programme 
The SIRF community carnival programme commissions artists to engage with local schools and community groups supporting them to create costumes, carnival structures, music and performances, interpreting an annually agreed theme, which then become a vibrant and colourful procession through the centre of Stockton starting at noon on the Saturday afternoon. By the 2016 festival this had grown to 1,211 participants, spread over 49 different community groups. Previous carnival themes have included:

References

External links 
 Stockton International Riverside Festival (SIRF)
 Stockton-on-Tees Borough Council

Stockton-on-Tees
Art festivals in the United Kingdom
International festivals
Recurring events established in 1988
Arts festivals in England
August events
1988 establishments in England
Events in England